Fernand Joseph Rivard (January 18, 1946 – July 31, 1993) was a Canadian professional ice hockey player. He played in 55 National Hockey League games with the Minnesota North Stars from 1968 to 1975. The rest of his career, which lasted from 1964 to 1975, was spent in the minor leagues. He was the first NHL player to wear the number 35.

Career statistics

Regular season and playoffs

External links
 

1946 births
1993 deaths
Canadian ice hockey goaltenders
Cleveland Barons (1937–1973) players
Ice hockey people from Quebec
Iowa Stars players
Jacksonville Barons players
Memphis South Stars players
Minnesota North Stars players
Montreal Junior Canadiens players
Muskegon Mohawks players
New Haven Nighthawks players
Peterborough Petes (ice hockey) players
Quebec Aces (AHL) players
Sportspeople from Shawinigan